Frederick Wistar Morris, III (August 11, 1905 – November 10, 1971) was a sailor from the United States, who represented his country at the 1928 Summer Olympics in Amsterdam, Netherlands.

Sources 
 

Sailors at the 1928 Summer Olympics – 6 Metre
Olympic sailors of the United States
1905 births
1971 deaths
American male sailors (sport)